Mount Priestley is a mountain in the Kitimat Ranges of the Coast Mountains of British Columbia, Canada. Mount Priestly has an elevation  and prominence measure of  making it one of Canada's many ultra prominent peaks. It was first climbed by Drew Copeland, John Gill and Jordan Craven June 20, 2017.

See also
List of Ultras of North America

References

Two-thousanders of British Columbia
Kitimat Ranges
Cassiar Land District